Italy competed at the 1975 European Athletics Indoor Championships in Katowice, Poland, from 8 to 9 March 1975.

Medalists
In this edition of the championships, Italy did not win any medals.

Top eight
Three Italian athletes reached the top eight in this edition of the championships.
Men

Women

See also
 Italy national athletics team

References

External links
 EAA official site 

1975
1975 European Athletics Indoor Championships
1975 in Italian sport